Cristian Marian Manea (born 9 August 1997) is a Romanian professional footballer who plays as a right-back for Liga I club CFR Cluj and the Romania national team.

Club career

Viitorul Constanța
Born in Agigea, Constanța County, Manea is a youth exponent of Viitorul Constanța, for which he made his Liga I debut on 21 April 2014 in a 0–3 home loss to FC Steaua București.

Investment fund
In 2014, an investment fund acquired player's rights and Manea arrived in Cyprus at Apollon Limassol. The deal was reported to be €2.5 million. Previously, Romanian media suggested that he had been sold to Chelsea for around £2.3 million, but the rumours proved to be false.

Various loans
He spent the 2014–15 campaign on loan at former club Viitorul, and scored his first senior goal on 13 April 2015 in a 2–1 away defeat of Petrolul Ploiești.

On 28 August 2015, he moved to Belgian team Royal Excel Mouscron on a season-long loan, which was extended for an additional year. Manea amassed 18 appearances in all competitions before returning to Romania on 27 June 2017, joining CFR Cluj also on loan. He was an undisputed starter in his two years at the club, winning back-to-back national championships.

On 2 September 2019, FCSB have agreed a deal to sign Manea on loan with an option to buy the right back.

International career
Manea earned caps for Romania at under-16, under-17, under-19 and under-21 levels. In May 2014, aged 16, he was called up to the senior team by manager Victor Pițurcă despite having only made five club appearances at the time. Manea made his debut as a starter against Albania on the 31st that month, subsequently becoming the youngest footballer to play for Romania after breaking the previous record set by Grațian Sepi in 1928.

Manea registered his first senior goal for the country on 5 June 2018, scoring the opener in a 2–0 friendly win over Finland at the Ilie Oană Stadium in Ploiești.

Personal life
On 15 September 2020, his spouse gave birth to a daughter.

Career statistics

Club

International

International goals

Honours
CFR Cluj
Liga I: 2017–18, 2018–19, 2019–20, 2020–21, 2021–22
Supercupa României: 2018, 2020

Individual
Liga I Team of the Season: 2017–18

Notes

References

External links

1997 births
Living people
People from Constanța County
Romanian footballers
Association football defenders
Liga I players
FC Viitorul Constanța players
Apollon Limassol FC players
Belgian Pro League players
Royal Excel Mouscron players
CFR Cluj players
FC Steaua București players
Romania youth international footballers
Romania under-21 international footballers
Romania international footballers
Romanian expatriate footballers
Expatriate footballers in Cyprus
Romanian expatriate sportspeople in Cyprus
Expatriate footballers in Belgium
Romanian expatriate sportspeople in Belgium